Fanchykovo is a locality in Berehove Raion of the Zakarpattia Oblast in western Ukraine.

Fanchykovo is also known as Fanchykovo (Ukrainian), Fanchikovo (Russian), Fancsika (Hungarian), Fančikovo (Slovakian), Fanecsika, Fanchykove, and Fantschykowo.  It was formerly in Czechoslovakia.

References

External links
JewishGen Locality Page - Fanchykovo, Ukraine

Villages in Berehove Raion